Boguszyce  (formerly German Boguschütz) is a village in the administrative district of Gmina Toszek, within Gliwice County, Silesian Voivodeship, in southern Poland.

The village has a population of 277.

References

Boguszyce